The 1982 Clásica de San Sebastián was the second edition of the Clásica de San Sebastián cycle race and was held on 12 August 1982. The race started and finished in San Sebastián. The race was won by Marino Lejarreta.

General classification

References

Clásica de San Sebastián
San